Milan (Sanskrit for unification/coming together) is the National-Level Cultural Festival organized by the Directorate of Student Affairs of SRM Institute of Science and Technology. Milan is five day fest with a foray of events that spans extensively over a number of sporting events and multifarious music, dance and art events. Every year in addition to these events, Milan also brings to SRM some top-notch music band performances and Proshows. The 2015 edition of Milan attempted to break the Guinness World Record with 100 hours of continuous events.

History
Milan first began in 2008. Commencing with about 25 events in 2008, Milan has grown over the course of time to host over a 100+ different creative and fun-infused events of art, dance, music and sports with ever-expanding participation from across the country. Several prominent celebrities including Asha Bhonsle, Mammoothy, Kamal Hassan, Suriya, Vetrimaran, Aditya Roy Kapoor, Karthick, John Abraham, Vishal and Shekher, Nucleya, Amit Trivedi, Vijay Deverakonda, Yashika Anand, Sorabh Pant, Rahul Subramainan have graced Milan with their presence over the years.

Live band performances and concerts have been major attractions at Milan year after year. There have also been some outstanding stand-up comedy performances by some nation-wide famous comedy groups like Evam Tamasha, East India Comedy, OML. In 2020, Milan will commemorate its 13th successful edition at SRM Institute of Science and Technology.

Events
Milan organizes over a 120+ events every year which encompass over a multitude of domains. In the past few years, there have been a set of Pre- Milan Events which have been instrumental in setting the stage afire for Milan

Literary events
Each year in Milan, a number of literary events like debates, extempore and essay-writing that take place provide a platform to young orators and writers to exhibit their literary skills. Topics range from politics, ethics to environment and technology all of which are the need of the hour to build a socially-conscious and intellectually adept generation of youth. These literary events occur in several languages including English, Tamil and Telugu, thus, ensuring avid participation from the diverse student body.

Funzone
Funzone, previously known as Informals, is one of the major attractions for participants of the festival. It involves a variety of events, the major highlights being, the legendary treasure-hunt, Mythos D' Aghor and Milan Roadies which come with grand cash prizes. Milan’17 saw the advent of a fresh set of games like Man v/s Food, Memenia and Nincompoops which have been major show stealers.

Creativity and Fine Arts
This is a domain in which artists can let loose their creative genius with events like road graffiti, wall-painting, collage-making and poster-making. Often, these art works represent an underlying theme and bring to light thought-provoking ideas and social messages through the sublime medium of art.

Music
Music at Milan has been an ever-evolving domain with some classic events like solo singing and instrumentals with a fusion of a new batch of events like Rap Battles, Beat-boxing, Acapella, Battle of the Bands, Jugalbandi and so on which have been redefining standards every year with fierce and enthusiastic participation from new talent every year.

Dance
With a plethora of events like Pro Battle, Adapt Tune, Choreonite and Choreonite +, the dance domain is easily one that attracts all the participants and audience. Power-packed performances of dance groups and individuals put the audience in a trance and never fail to amaze talented artists called upon to judge these events.

Colosseum
As the official domain for dramatics, Colosseum comes with the best of events which allow participants to put on their thinking cap and exhibit their creations through short films, script-writing and theatrics. As the saying goes, "The battle of Waterloo was won on the playing fields of Eton", budding actors and actresses are made on the stages of Colosseum.

Aeromodelling
"The sky is the limit." But with the Aeromodelling domain, there are participants breaking all bounds. It is the one-stop domain for aeromodelling enthusiasts to explore their prowess into designing their own craft and flying high.

Environment
The environment club comes with its special set of events each year at Milan to reiterate the need for sustainability and protection of the environment. Events like Green Avengers and Ecoshoot among others have set the track straight for the kind of trails that educated humans must leave behind.

Online Events
The online events are yet another stunning attraction in a world that is heading increasingly towards the virtual. With innovative events like Story of My Life and Hastags, this domain is a star among all online stars at Milan.

Fashion
The fashion domain of SRM sets the bar higher each year with a stellar fashion show. With an ingenious display of fashion collections designed by students themselves, the Vogue Way proves to be nothing short of a creative grandeur.

Proshows
Professional acts that have appeared at Milan in the past include:
Junkyard Grooves (2008)
Benny Dayal (2009)
Karthik (2010)
Bombay Rockers (2010)
Shreya Ghoshal (2011)
Rhythm Dhol Bass (2012)
Daler Mehndi (2014)
Tiny Fingers (2015)
Thaikkudam bridge (2016)
Devi Sri Prasad (2016)
DJ Kaila Troy (2016)
EIC (2017)
Anushka Manchanda (2017)
Palak Muchhal (2017)
Palash Muchhal (2017)
Vishal Dadlani (2017)
Shekhar Ravjiani (2017)
Amit Trivedi (2018)
Nucleya (2018)
Vijay Deverakonda (2018)
Sorabh Pant (2018)
Rahul Subramanian (2018)
Rohan Joshi (2019) 
Saurav Mehta (2019) 
Salim–Sulaiman (2019) 
Jonita Gandhi (2019) 
Bassjackers (2019)
Shruti Haasan (2019)
Rakul Preet Singh (2020)
Vidya Vox (2020)
Divine (rapper) (2020)
Abish Mathew (2020)
Nani (2023)

Guest appearances
Asha Bhosle, Tamannaah and Reemma Sen were the guests of the inaugural Milan in 2008. In 2009 Padmashri Dr Kamal Haasan was the chief guest and students were privileged to listen to his motivational talk in building up one's life. Vijayakanth was the special attraction in 2010. In 2011, M. Balamuralikrishna and Vikram were the guest of honor and chief guest respectively. Vani Jairam, Shriya Saran, Taapsee Pannu were also among the guests that year. In 2012, R. Sarathkumar and Siddharth visited the campus on the first day of Milan, followed by Jiiva, Andrea Jeremiah, Ameer Sultan and Mammootty. In 2016 John Abraham Inaugurated Milan and Valedictory guest was Vetrimaran. In 2017 Aditya Roy Kapoor Inaugurated Milan and R. Sarathkumar was the special attraction of Milan'17 and In 2018 Vijay Deverakonda Inaugurated Milan and Amit Trivedi, Nucleya was the special attraction of Milan'18. Milan'20 guest list is an exciting mix of talented individuals from various fields. The lineup includes the stunning Rakul Preet Singh, the multi-talented Vidya Vox, the dynamic Lost Stories, the electrifying Dj SA, the charismatic Rapper Divine, the talented Nivetha Thomas, and the dashing Siddharth. Each of these personalities brings their unique skills and expertise to the event, making it an unforgettable experience for all attendees. From music to acting, from rapping to DJing, Milan 2020 promised to be an exhilarating celebration of diverse talents and cultural exchange.
Milan'23 played host to a star-studded event featuring notable guests from the Tollywood film industry, including popular actor Nani, and renowned musician  Karthik. The event also saw the attendance of international talents such as DJ Diego Miranda and KEVU, who brought their signature beats to the occasion. Furthermore, the cast and crew of the Tamil movie Parundhaaguthu Oor Kuruvi, featuring Vivek Prasanna, actor Kavin from movie  Dada graced the event with their presence, adding to the excitement of the evening.

Butterflies
Butterflies is a social initiative undertaken by SRM University which aims to aid the under-privileged school children in and around the Kancheepuram district, Tamil Nadu. The program strives to provide education children and thereby help them overcome social issues they are subjected to and to prevent early school dropouts. In an attempt to share the joy and happiness that Milan stood for, Butterflies came into being. Hosted with a tagline ‘Inspiring Change’, Butterflies continues to be a huge step in the campaign that aims at giving back joy to the society.

Every year children studying in government schools from Kancheepuram district, Tamil Nadu are invited to compete in cultural, literary, sports and other events. Winners are awarded with prizes and medals. The school with the maximum points and participation in maximum number of events is awarded the ‘Best School Trophy’. Breakfast and lunch are provided to the children and their accompanying staff members along with a souvenir and certificate. Transportation is provided for the children from and to their schools on the day. In 2012, Butterflies unveiled its 'School Adoption Program' which focuses on grooming the students in various fields including computer skills, spoken English, extra-curricular activities and academics.

Hospitality
During Milan, SRM University provides accommodation to non-local students. The food stalls during Milan provide a wide platter of cuisines in one place and are a huge hit among students. Participants from other colleges are provided complete guidance about the means of transportation and routes to University by the Hospitality Domain.

Organising

Milan'23
Milan 2023 was a four-day event organized by the Directorate of Student Affairs (DSA) from 2 March 2023 to 5 March 2023. The event comprised several shows and the inaugural event that took place on 2 March at 2.00 PM. The tickets were classified into three categories: ₹1000, ₹750, and ₹250. The ₹1000 ticket granted access to all the shows and the inaugural event, while the ₹750 ticket provided access to most of the events, excluding the inaugural event and specific shows. The ₹250 ticket was mandatory for every participant in the event.

To manage ticketing for the event, Team Milan created a new website from scratch. However, when the tickets went live, the site could not handle the high demand, resulting in server crashes. Some students managed to purchase tickets, while others were unable to do so. Team Milan promptly addressed this issue and provided an alternative payment link. The updated ticket costs were ₹1277 and ₹885. The ₹250 tickets remained available on Milan's official website.

On the day of the inaugural event, many students had been waiting in queues for their passes since morning. Despite multiple changes in pass issue venues, the crowds continued to gather and wait for their passes. However, the queues were not adequately managed by the team, and those who were last in line remained there for hours. Meanwhile, others who went straight to the counter managed to get their tickets within minutes. Additionally, there was no ticket checking at the entrances of the events, resulting in a massive crowd rushing into the T.P Ganeshan Auditorium to attend the inaugural event where Nani was present. Consequently, the auditorium quickly filled up, and many people who had purchased the ₹1000 ticket and should have attended the inaugural event missed out because others without tickets had rushed in.

Despite the chaotic start, the situation improved somewhat for the events on 2 March, thanks to the help of the Police Force of Tambaram Circle. However, the lack of proper ticket checking remained an issue throughout the event. On 5 March, the venue for Sundeep Sharma's comedy night was changed from the auditorium to the ground at short notice. Fortunately, there was no ruckus for the event on the last day since there were fewer attendees.

In conclusion, Milan 2023 was a value-for-money event, although attendees could enter the event without purchasing a ticket. The organizers should have managed the queues and ticket checking better, especially for the inaugural event, to avoid overcrowding and ensure that those who purchased higher-priced tickets could attend the events they paid for.

External Links
 

 on YouTube
Milan Website

References

Cultural festivals in India
Engineering colleges in Chennai